Miss Malaysia Universe 2009, the 43rd edition of the Miss Universe Malaysia, was held on 30 May 2009 at Royale Chulan Hotel, Kuala Lumpur. Joannabelle Ng of Sabah was crowned by the outgoing titleholder, Levy Li of Terengganu at the end of the event. She then represented Malaysia at the Miss Universe 2006 pageant at Nassau, The Bahamas.

Results

Special awards

Contestants

Crossovers 
Contestants who previously competed/appeared at other national beauty pageants:

Miss Tourism Queen International 2009
 2009 - Cassandra Patrick (Top 20)

References 

2009 in Malaysia
2009 beauty pageants
2009